Sotirios Notaris may refer to:

 Sotirios Notaris (fencer) (1879–1924), Greek Olympic fencer
 Sotirios Notaris (wrestler), Greek Olympic wrestler